Penske Corporation, Inc. is an American diversified transportation services company based in Bloomfield Township, Oakland County, Michigan. Roger Penske is the chairman of the privately held company, and Rob Kurnick is the president.

Holdings

Current
 DAVCO Technology (transportation component manufacturing)
 Ilmor Engineering (high performance motorsport engines)
 Penske Automotive Group (PAG:NYSE – a 40+% stake)
 Penske Entertainment Corporation; parent company of:
IMS, LLC (Operators of the race track)
IMS Productions, Inc. (broadcast television production company with satellite trucks, TV trucks and audio/visual editing facilities)
Indianapolis Motor Speedway (2.5-mile race track in Speedway, Indiana)
INDYCAR, LLC (Motorsports sanctioning body; parent company of the IndyCar Series)
 Penske Logistics (supply chain management and logistics service)
 Penske Motor Group (retail automotive in California and Texas)
 Premier Truck Group (commercial vehicle dealerships)
 Penske Truck Leasing (joint venture with Penske Corp. and Mitsui & Co., Ltd)
 Penske Truck Rental (truck rental services)
 Team Penske (IndyCar and NASCAR)
 Truck-Lite (transportation component manufacturing)
 Carshop (certified used vehicle dealer)
 DS Penske (Formula E team owned in partnership with DS Automobiles)

Former
 Detroit Diesel – A former GM subsidiary, Penske purchased a portion of the company in 1988 and, together with General Motors, spun the company off into a separate company. Sold to DaimlerChrysler AG in 2000.
 DJR Team Penske (51% stake) (Australian V8 Supercars team) sold in 2020
 Penske Auto Centers – A former subsidiary that had operated auto repair centers within selected Kmart stores from 1995 until 2002.
 VM Motori S.p.A. – 50% was bought in 2003 and the rest in 2007, but a 51% stake was sold to Fiat S.p.A. in February 2011, and the remainder sold to Fiat in 2013.

References

External links

 
Companies based in Oakland County, Michigan
Bloomfield Hills, Michigan
Transport companies established in 1969
1969 establishments in Michigan
Trucking companies of the United States
Transportation companies based in Michigan
Team Penske